Khaneqah-e Gilavan (also Romanized as Khāneqāh-e Gīlavān; also known as Kanaga, Kanjeh, Khānehqāh, Khāneqāh, and Khānehqāh-e Gīlavān) is a village in Shal Rural District, Shahrud District, Khalkhal County, Ardabil Province, Iran. At the 2006 census, its population was 112, in 40 families.

References 

Towns and villages in Khalkhal County